Red Cap is a British television drama series, produced by Stormy Pictures for the BBC and broadcast on BBC One. A total of thirteen episodes were broadcast over the course of two series, beginning with a feature-length pilot on 28 December 2001. The series follows the investigations and personal relationships of a British Army Special Investigation Branch unit of the Royal Military Police based in Germany.

The series initially focused on lead character, Sergeant Jo McDonagh (Tamzin Outhwaite), who was nicknamed McDoughnut, but later series played out as more of an ensemble piece, with several notable characters coming to prominence. A number of fictional regiments were featured in the series, including the Bedford Light Infantry, the Royal Cumbrian Fusiliers, the Wessex Regiment and the Derbyshire Light Infantry.

Cast
 Tamzin Outhwaite as Sgt. Jo McDonagh
 Douglas Hodge as Sgt. Maj. Kenneth "Kenny" Burns
 James Thornton as Staff Sgt. Philip "Hippy" Roper
 Gordon Kennedy as Sgt. Bruce Hornsby
 Joachim Raaf as Detective Thomas Strauss
 William Beck as Sgt. Maj. Steve Forney
 Maggie Lloyd-Williams as Cpl. Angie Ogden
 Peter Guinness as Capt. Gavin Howard
 Blake Ritson as Lt. Giles Vicary
 Raquel Cassidy as Staff Sgt. Neve Kirland (Series 1)
 Poppy Miller as Staff Sgt. Harriet Frost (Series 2)
 Ian Burfield as Sgt. Sam Perkins (Series 1)

Episodes

Pilot (2001)

Series 1 (2003)

Series 2 (2004)

Production
According to BBC sources, Outhwaite spent a week familiarising herself with Army life at the Reserve Training and Mobilisation Centre in Chilwell, Nottingham, prior to filming the series. Training included unarmed combat, 9mm pistol training, driving, drill, and understanding the Army's labyrinthine hierarchical structure. The series creator and writer, Emmy and Golden Globe nominee Patrick Harbinson, was in the army himself and previously wrote fifteen episodes of the ITV military series Soldier Soldier. A BBC spokesman said; "With such experience, Patrick infuses Red Cap with a tangible sense of realism."

On 13 March 2004 Red Cap was axed by BBC executives, who cited: "At a cost of £10 million and an audience of just 5.5 million, executives thought it would not be worthwhile to renew it for another series."

References

External links
Red Cap at bbc.co.uk
 

BBC television dramas
2001 British television series debuts
2004 British television series endings
2000s British drama television series
British military television series
Military fiction
English-language television shows
Television shows set in Germany
Television shows set in London